Sir Walter Hartwell James , (29 March 1863 – 3 January 1943) was the fifth Premier of Western Australia and an ardent supporter of the federation movement.

Background and early career
James was born in Perth, in what was then the British colony of Western Australia. He was educated at Perth Boys School and later at Perth High School (now Hale School). After his father's death, his mother remarried to George Randell, a member of the Legislative Council. James was thus the step-brother of Ernest Randell, who later played cricket for Western Australia. In his youth, James worked as a jackaroo at De Grey Station in the Pilbara, but after being shipwrecked off Rottnest Island in 1883 on his way to the Pilbara, he turned to the legal profession.  He was articled to George Leake in 1883, and was admitted to the Western Australian bar in 1888. Shortly afterwards he went into partnership with Leake. James also played football for the Rovers Football Club in the West Australian Football Association. He later served as secretary of the Association. On 21 June 1892, he married Eleanora Marie Gwenifryd Hearder.

Political career
From 1890 to 1896, James represented Central Ward on Perth City Council.  In 1894 he was elected to the Legislative Assembly seat of East Perth.  James sat in the Legislative Assembly as an independent, and was a consistent opponent of John Forrest's government.  He was a strong advocate for social reform, working for women's suffrage over a long period, and playing an active part in the establishment of a compulsory, free, secular education system.  He became an active member of the Western Australian Liberal Association, a reformist organisation that pursued liberal ideals.

James was also strongly in favour of federation, and campaigned heavily with George Leake and James Gardiner for Western Australia to become an original member of the Federation.  He was a member of the Western Australian delegation to the Federal Conventions of 1897 and 1898, but missed three quarters of its votes, the worst absence record of any delegate. In May 1898 he helped found the Federal League, and in the same month Edmund Barton thanked James for his "generous contributions" to the Yes campaign in the NSW federation referendum.

On 28 June 1901, James was appointed minister without portfolio in the first Leake government.  In 1902 he was made KC.  After Leake died in late June 1902, "Nutty" James, as he was popularly known, was appointed Premier and Attorney-General on 1 July.  As premier, James fought for the state's interests against an aggressive Commonwealth executive.  He also led a reforming government; its achievements include legalization of the union movement, the first workers' compensation, a stronger Arbitration Act, and the opening of the current Parliament House. James also tried but failed to reform the franchise; he achieved only the abolition of plural voting, and an increase in Goldfields representation.  These changes appear to have been his undoing, as it is likely that they were key factors in Labor's strong support in the election of 28 June 1904, after which James was defeated when Parliament next met on 10 August 1904.

Post-political career
On 22 September 1904, James resigned from parliament to take up an appointment as Agent-General for Western Australia in London.  He was appointed Knight Bachelor on 28 June 1907.  After returning to Perth from London, he devoted himself to his legal practice and rose to prominence as a leading member of the Bar.  In 1910 he contested the Legislative Assembly seat of Beverley at a by-election, but was unsuccessful.

James was involved with the East Perth Cricket Club (now Perth Cricket Club) in the WACA and served a two-season term as President of the club from 1908 to 1910.

In 1909, James was appointed to a Royal Commission to enquire into the establishment of a university in Perth.  When the University of Western Australia was established, he became a founding member.  He continued to serve the university for many years, and was elected pro-Chancellor on 19 August 1929 and Chancellor on 17 March 1930; and retired in 1936.

In 1931, James was elevated to KCMG.  In 1932, he declined an offer from Premier James Mitchell to become Lieutenant-Governor of Western Australia.  In 1936, he accepted an honorary degree of Doctor of Laws.  He died on 3 January 1943, and was buried at Karrakatta Cemetery.

See also
1904 East Perth state by-election

References

Further reading

1863 births
1943 deaths
Agents-General for Western Australia
Attorneys-General of Western Australia
Australian Knights Bachelor
Australian Knights Commander of the Order of St Michael and St George
Australian politicians awarded knighthoods
Burials at Karrakatta Cemetery
Members of the Western Australian Legislative Assembly
People educated at Hale School
Premiers of Western Australia
Rovers Football Club players
University of Western Australia chancellors
West Australian Football League administrators
Perth City Councillors